"Bleed You Dry" is the fourth single by Australian rock band Grinspoon from their fourth studio album Thrills, Kills & Sunday Pills. It was released on 13 June 2005 via Universal Records, which peaked in the top 100 on the ARIA Singles Chart. The music video for "Bleed You Dry" was directed by James Hackett and Jean Camden and was a finalist in the 2005 SoundKILDA music video competition as part of the St Kilda Film Festival.

Track listing

Charts

References 

2005 singles
Grinspoon songs
2004 songs
Universal Records singles
Songs written by Phil Jamieson
Song recordings produced by Howard Benson